"Where Do You Go To (My Lovely)?" is a song by the British singer-songwriter Peter Sarstedt. Its recording was produced by Ray Singer, engineered by John Mackswith at Lansdowne Recording Studios and released in 1969. The music has been described as "a faux European waltz tune," and the arrangement is a very simple one of strummed acoustic guitar and bass guitar, with brief bursts of French-style accordion at the start and the end. The arranger and conductor was Ian Green.

Lyrics

The song is about a fictional girl named Marie-Claire who grows up on the poverty-stricken backstreets of Naples, becomes a member of the jet set, and goes on to live in Paris. The lyrics describe her from the perspective of a childhood friend; it is left unclear whether they have remained close. The rhetorical question of the title suggests that her glamorous lifestyle might not have brought Marie-Claire happiness or contentment.

Even though Sarstedt himself was not French, the song benefited from the contemporary awareness in Britain of such French and Belgian singers as Serge Gainsbourg and Jacques Brel (Belgium-born of Flemish descent).

The lyrics contain a large number of contemporary and other references:

 Marlene Dietrich: German–American actress and singer
 Zizi Jeanmaire: French ballerina
 Pierre Balmain: French designer of elegant fashions
 Boulevard Saint-Michel: street in the Latin Quarter of Paris
 The Rolling Stones: popular British rock and roll band
 Sacha Distel: French singer and musician
 Sorbonne: University of Paris
 Picasso: Spanish pioneer of modern art
 Juan-les-Pins: fashionable beach resort on the French Riviera
 Topless swimsuit: first conceived by Austrian American fashion designer Rudi Gernreich in 1964
 Saint Moritz: fashionable ski resort in the Engadin, Swiss Alps
 Napoleon brandy: a blended brandy in which the youngest brandy of the blend has been aged for at least six years
 Aga Khan: world-traveling Islamic leader and racehorse owner

The version on the album Peter Sarstedt is longer than the radio edit version released as a single, having extra stanzas beginning "You go to the embassy parties ..." and "You're in between twenty and thirty....". The difference in length between the two versions is approximately 30 seconds.

Inspiration
It is often suspected that the name Marie-Claire is inspired by Marie Claire magazine, a women's fashion weekly that began in 1937 in France. One theory says that the song is about the Italian actress Sophia Loren, who was abandoned by her father and had a poverty-stricken life in Naples. Another theory has the song being inspired by Danish singer and actress Nina van Pallandt.

According to Alan Cooper: "Sarstedt insisted it was not written with actress Sophia Loren in mind. 'Yes, it's a portrait of a poor-born girl who becomes a member of the European jet set. And yes, there's reference to her growing up on the "back streets of Naples", so I can see why people may think it was written with Sophia Loren in mind. But that's just a coincidence. I really wasn't thinking of anyone specific.

The song was written in Copenhagen.

In 2009, Sarstedt spoke to a gossip columnist for the Daily Express. He admitted he had lied about the song being about a socialite who died in a fire. He said that the song was about his girlfriend at the time, whom he later married and then divorced.

Reception
John Bush of allmusic called the song "an exquisite piece of Baroque pop that Sarstedt would never come close to equaling again" and said that the song "blended the reserve of early British singer/songwriter with the sophistication of Continental pop."

The song was a hit far exceeding Sarstedt's other work, although he is not a one-hit wonder. In 1998 he was earning £60,000 annually in royalties from it.

DJ John Peel once said in an interview with New Musical Express that he considered this song the worst of all time.

The song was used as a soundtrack in Wes Anderson's 2007 film The Darjeeling Limited and in Jennifer Saunders's 2016 film Absolutely Fabulous: The Movie.

Sequel
In 1997 Sarstedt recorded a sequel, "The Last of the Breed (Lovely 2)," on his CD England's Lane. This picks up the story of Marie Claire 20 years on, living now in London.  It names more people and places, including Belgravia, Ballets Russes, Cape Town, Claridge's, Gstaad, John Galliano, Harrods, Jerusalem, Long Island, Milan, Rudolf Nureyev, Palm Beach, Rio de Janeiro, and Isabella Rossellini. In recent years, Sarstedt and a co-writer were working on a further sequel, "Farewell Marie-Claire," in which the story was brought to a conclusion. The song was to feature the same waltz feel as the original. But Sarstedt's retirement from the music industry meant that the track was abandoned.

Chart history and performance

It was a number-one 1 hit in the UK Singles Chart for four weeks in 1969, and was awarded the 1970 Ivor Novello Award for Best Song Musically and Lyrically. In the United States, the record reached No. 61 on the Cash Box Top 100 Singles. The single also peaked at No. 70 on the Billboard Hot 100 that May.

Weekly charts

Year-end charts

Certifications

References

1969 singles
2006 singles
UK Singles Chart number-one singles
Number-one singles in Australia
Irish Singles Chart number-one singles
Number-one singles in New Zealand
Number-one singles in South Africa
Peter Sarstedt songs
1969 songs
United Artists Records singles
Songs about socialites